James King Romano  (April 6, 1927 – September 12, 1990) was an American right-handed pitcher in Major League Baseball. Born in Brooklyn, New York, he pitched in three games for the Brooklyn Dodgers during the 1950 baseball season. He died at age 63 in New York City.

References

External links

1927 births
1990 deaths
Major League Baseball pitchers
Brooklyn Dodgers players
Asheville Tourists players
Nashua Dodgers players
Olean Oilers players
St. Paul Saints (AA) players
Montreal Royals players
Baseball players from New York (state)
Sportspeople from Brooklyn
Baseball players from New York City